"Tierra bendita y divina", also known as "Tierra de la Palestina", is a traditional Spanish language Christian hymn derived from Cuba and composed by Robert C. Savage in 1954. It describes the land of Palestine and the details of Jesus' life, and refers to certain historical Israelite places: the Western Wall, the Mount of Beatitudes, and the Jaffa Gate.

Lyrical controversy
On the line, "Tierra bendita y divina, es la de Palestina", the Holy Land is referred to as Palestine. The origin of the name "Palestine" translates in Hebrew Pəléshseth (פלשת), which refers to the kingdom of Philistia: arch-enemy of Israel and west of the Kingdom of Judah.

Lyrics
These are the lyrics in Spanish:

References

External links
 Tierra bendita y divina lyrics at Himnes Cristians

Christian hymns
1954 songs